Verdi "Vern" Barberis (27 June 1928 – 6 January 2005) was an Australian lightweight weightlifter.

Barberis grew up in Melbourne and attended the University of Melbourne and studied science. This was the first time that weightlifting had been contested at the Games. He won another bronze medal at the 1952 Summer Olympics, becoming the first Australian to win a weightlifting medal at the Olympics. Later at the 1954 British Empire and Commonwealth Games he became the first Australian to win a weightlifting gold medal at a major international competition. The seven-time national champion rounded out his career at the 1956 Summer Olympics in his home city of Melbourne, where he finished 11th.

His Australian records stood for many years and his Victorian snatch record lasted twenty years.

Barberis was a highly respected teacher and trainer. Between 1969 and 1971, he served as President of the Australian Weightlifting Federation. He was later inducted into the AWF Hall of Fame, and on 30 August 2000 awarded the Australian Sports Medal for his weightlifting achievements.

References

External links
 AUSTRALIAN WEIGHTLIFTING PIONEER: VERN BARBERIS

1928 births
2005 deaths
Australian male weightlifters
Olympic weightlifters of Australia
Weightlifters at the 1952 Summer Olympics
Weightlifters at the 1956 Summer Olympics
Weightlifters at the 1950 British Empire Games
Weightlifters at the 1954 British Empire and Commonwealth Games
Olympic bronze medalists for Australia
Commonwealth Games gold medallists for Australia
Commonwealth Games bronze medallists for Australia
Recipients of the Australian Sports Medal
Medalists at the 1952 Summer Olympics
Commonwealth Games medallists in weightlifting
University of Melbourne alumni
Olympic medalists in weightlifting
Medallists at the 1950 British Empire Games
Medallists at the 1954 British Empire and Commonwealth Games